Finn Graham (born 5 March 1996) is a Scottish professional footballer who plays as a midfielder for Scottish club Crossgates Primrose F.C. He has previously played for Arbroath, Dunfermline Athletic, Berwick Rangers, Brechin City and Kelty Hearts.

Career
Born in Kirkcaldy, Graham began his career with Kelty Marian Colts before joining Dunfermline Athletic as a youth player in 2004. After a limited number of first team opportunities, Graham was released by Dunfermline in May 2015 and subsequently dropped down a division to Scottish League Two, signing for Berwick Rangers on a one-year deal. After a successful season with Berwick, Graham was signed by Scottish League One club Brechin City. He spent two seasons with Brechin, before signing for Arbroath in July 2018, following a successful trial period. on 22 November, Graham became Barry Ferguson's first signing for Lowland league team Kelty Hearts on a short term deal. Graham moved to Australia in February 2019 to sign with Stirling Lions SC.

Career statistics

References

External links

1996 births
Living people
Scottish footballers
Association football midfielders
Dunfermline Athletic F.C. players
Berwick Rangers F.C. players
Brechin City F.C. players
Arbroath F.C. players
Scottish Professional Football League players
Kelty Hearts F.C. players
Stirling Macedonia FC players
Scottish expatriate sportspeople in Australia
Scottish expatriate footballers
Expatriate soccer players in Australia